A secret is information kept hidden.

Secret or The Secret may also refer to:

Arts, entertainment, and media

Comics and manga
 Secret, the 2012–2014 comic series by Jonathan Hickman and Ryan Bodenheim
 Secret, the 2013 manga series sequel to the Doubt series, by Yoshiki Tonogai
 The Secret (Dark Horse Comics), a 2007 limited series comic book

Fictional entities
 Secret (Greta Hayes), first appearance June 1998, a fictional superhero
 The Secret, the MacGuffin in the 2007 The Secret Series by Pseudonymous Bosch

Films
 A Secret, a 2007 French drama by Claude Miller
 Secret (2007 film), a Taiwanese romance by Jay Chou
 Secret (2009 film), a South Korean thriller by Yoon Jae-goo
 Secrets (1992 American film), an American made-for-television drama film directed by Peter H. Hunt
 Secrets (1992 Australian film), an Australian film starring Dannii Minogue
 The Secret (1955 film), a British film by Cy Endfield
 The Secret (1974 film), a French thriller by Robert Enrico
The Secret, a 1979 Hong Kong film by Ann Hui
The Secret, a 1988 Venezuelan film by Luis Armando Roche
 The Secret (1990 film), an Italian film by Francesco Maselli
 The Secret (1992 film), an American made-for-TV movie about dyslexia by Karen Arthur
 The Secret (2001 film), a French film by Virginie Wagon
 The Secret (2006 film), a self-help film by Drew Heriot
 The Secret (2007 film), a French thriller by Vincent Perez
Dead Time: Kala, also known as The Secret, an Indonesian neo-noir thriller by Joko Anwar
 The Secret (2007 film), a French thriller by Vincent Pérez
 The Secret (2016 film), a Chinese film by Wong Chun-chun
 The Secret: Dare to Dream (2020 film), an American film directed by Andy Tennant

Literature
 The Secret (Byrne book), a 2006 self-help book by Rhonda Byrne
 The Secret (novel), a 1997 book in the Animorphs series
 "The Secret" (short story), a 1963 short story, by Arthur C. Clarke
 The Secret (treasure hunt), a treasure hunt and puzzle book created by Byron Preiss in 1982
 The Secret, an 1833 juvenile story by Charlotte Brontë
 The Secret, a 1950 novel by Mary Roberts Rinehart
 The Secret: A Novel, a 2002 novel by Eva Hoffman
 The Secret, a 2016 novel by Kathryn Hughes

Music

Classical music 
 The Secret (opera) (Tajemství), by Bedřich Smetana

Groups 
 Secret (Russian band), a rock band
 Secret (South Korean band), a girl group

Albums and EPs 
 Secret (Ayumi Hamasaki album), 2006
 Secret (Classix Nouveaux album), 1983
 Secret (Kumi Koda album), 2005
 Secret (soundtrack), from the 2007 Taiwanese film
 Secret (EP), by Sebadoh, 2012
 Secret, by Anna Maria Jopek, 2005

Le Secret
 Le Secret (album), by Lara Fabian, 2013
 Le Secret (EP), by Alcest, 2005

The Secret
 The Secret (Alan Parsons album), 2019
 The Secret (Marie Picasso album), 2007
 The Secret (Austin Mahone EP), 2014
 The Secret (Vib Gyor EP), 2007
 The Secret (Cosmic Girls EP), 2016
 The Secret, an EP by the Airborne Toxic Event

Songs 
 "Secret" (Heart song), 1990
 "Secret" (Madonna song), 1994
 "Secret" (Maki Goto song), 2007
 "Secret" (Orchestral Manoeuvres in the Dark song), 1985
 "Secret (Take You Home)", by Kylie Minogue, 2004
 "Secret", by Johnny Rebb, 1963
 "Secret", by 21 Savage, 2020
 "Secret", by Maroon 5 from Songs About Jane, 2002
 "Secret", by Missy Higgins from On a Clear Night, 2007
 "Secret", by The Pierces from Thirteen Tales of Love and Revenge, 2007
 "Secret", by Spratleys Japs, 1999
 "Secret", by Way Out West from Intensify, 2001
 "Secret (Shh)", by Charli XCX from Vroom Vroom, 2016
 "Secret", by Audio Adrenaline from Bloom, 1996
 "Secrets" (The Weeknd song), 2016

"The Secret"
"The Secret", by Gene McDaniels, the B-side of "Tower of Strength", 1961
"The Secret", by Gino, 1963
"The Secret", by Gordon MacRae, 1958

Television

Series
 Secret (2000 TV series), a South Korean drama
 Secret (2011 TV series), a South Korean game-talk show
 Secret (2013 TV series), a South Korean drama
 The Secret (TV series), a 2016 British drama
 Sangue Oculto, a 2022 Portuguese telenovela also titled The Secret

Episodes
 "Secrets" (Ben 10)
 "The Secret" (Code Lyoko)
 "The Secret" (Dynasty 1984)
 "The Secret" (Dynasty 1986)
 "The Secret" (Highway to Heaven 1985)
 "The Secret" (The O.C.)
 "The Secret" (The Office)

Brands and enterprises
 Secret (app), from 2014–2015, an app for anonymous message sharing with friends
 Secret (chocolate bar), introduced in the 1980s, a chocolate bar manufactured by Nestlé
 Secret (deodorant brand), introduced in 1956, a brand of deodorant by Procter & Gamble

Other uses
 Secret (helmet), a type of skullcap
 Secret (liturgy), a type of prayer
 Secret (Sufism), a concept of islamic sufism
 Secret and Top Secret, levels of classified information
 Pendulum-and-hydrostat control, a closely-guarded method of torpedo guidance nicknamed "The Secret"
 , a United States Navy patrol boat in commission from 1917 to 1918
 Shared secret, in cryptography

See also
 Little Secrets (disambiguation)
 Secrecy (disambiguation)
 Secrets (disambiguation)